Ockelbo Municipality (Ockelbo kommun) is a municipality in Gävleborg County, in east central Sweden. Its seat is located in Ockelbo.

The present municipality was formed in 1971 through the amalgamation of "old" Ockelbo with Skog.

Localities 
 Lingbo
 Ockelbo (seat)
 Jädraås
 Åmot

References

External links

Ockelbo - official site

Municipalities of Gävleborg County